International protection may refer to:

 International Protection Rating
 protection under the Convention Relating to the Status of Refugees